Bruno Cetraro Berriolo (born 20 March 1998) is a Uruguayan rower.

He won two gold medals at U23 South American in Rio de Janeiro. He also initially won the gold medal at the 2019 Pan American Games with Martín González, Leandro Salvagno and Marcos Sarraute, before Sarraute was stripped of his medal for a doping violation. He participated in the lightweight single scull at the 2019 World Championships.

Along with Déborah Rodríguez, Cetraro will be one of two flagbearers for Uruguay at the 2020 Summer Olympics in Tokyo.

Together with Felipe Klüver, Cetraro achieved the second place in the semi-final of the light double pair and entered the grand final of their category at the Olympic Games; in the finals they were placed sixth.

References

1998 births
Living people
Uruguayan male rowers
Rowers at the 2015 Pan American Games
Rowers at the 2019 Pan American Games
Rowers at the 2020 Summer Olympics
Olympic rowers of Uruguay
Pan American Games competitors for Uruguay
21st-century Uruguayan people
Competitors at the 2022 South American Games